Fekete részem (translated My Dark Part) is the name of the fourth studio album released by Hungarian Post hardcore band AWS on October 1, 2018, via EDGE Records.

The album consists of 13 tracks, with the last three songs being recorded as bonus material. The bonus songs are Éjféli lány a cover of the same named song by Hungarian metal band Ossian, and two versions of Viszlát nyár. The album's running time is 45 minutes and 50 seconds.

Fekete részem peaked at no. 2 at the Hungarian Albums Chart and lasted three weeks in the rankings.

Background 
The recordings on the album started in the first quarter of 2018. The album was produced, mixed and mastered by the band's guitarist Bence Brucker at Y Sound Studio in Budapest, except for the song Éjfély lány, a cover version of the same named song which was released on the 1990s album A rock katonái by Hungarian metal band Ossian, which was produced by Dániel Kiss.

In an interview with Hungarian radio station Kaposvár Most vocalist Örs Siklósi stated that they could start writing radio friendly tracks due to their successful appearance at Eurovision Song Contest 2018 in Lisbon but they decided to write much darker and heavier songs.

The album's artwork was created by Kokái Barnabás of Barber's Art.

The album was officially announced on September 19, 2018.

Track list

Releases 
Hol voltál? the first single was already released in Summer of 2018 alongside a music video. Alongside the album release announcement on September 19.2018 the band released the second single called X/0.

The album itself was released on CD on October 1, 2018, while a digital release was set for October 12 the same year. On October 4, 2018, AWS announced the release of the single Fekete részem alongside a music video. The music video was directed by Péter Tokay of Pixel Films.

In November 2018 a music video for Lakatlan ember was released.

Lyrical themes 
The lyrics on Fekete részem deal with personal experiences, emotions, and personal views. In an interview singer Örs Siklósi stated following:

The very dark and seemingly hopeless track X/0 deals with living with a mental illness, especially living with depression. Lakatlan ember describes an average man who feels empty and helpless, who hates his own life and who can't escape this circle to achieve a better life situation. Hol voltál? was inspired a robbery in which the vocalist's grandfather was a victim. It deals with absent parents, friends or loved ones who turned their backs on the musicians for reaching their own selfish goals.

Éjjeli tánc is about sexuality, which was a huge taboo theme for vocalist Örs Siklósi. Fuss! is about the steady process of working in today's society, while the track Vigyázz rám is about the emotional relationship between children and their mothers, which Siklósi described as the most pure and most wonderful emotion.

Menedék was inspired by the book The Lower Depths by Russian writer Maxim Gorki and describes a place to hide and seek shelter for people at the edge of society. Viszlát nyár, which was the contribution of Hungary at the Eurovision Song Contest in 2018, deals about losing a loved one. The song is about Siklósi's father who died in the summer. It was written partly from the point of view of the father.

Tours 
The band participated in Eurovision Song Contest 2018 in Lisbon between May 10–12, 2018 with their song Viszlát nyár where they placed at no. 21 out of 26 participants in the final. The band performed at Eurovision pre-parties in Amsterdam and Madrid in the end of April 2018. Due to their appearance at the Eurovision Song Contest, the band was invited to play at Wacken Open Air in August later that year. The band performed at Hungary's own Rockmaraton in July.

On October 13 the same year, the band played a release party at Barba Negra in Budapest. On October 31, 2018, the band started touring throughout Hungary, Romania and Slovakia with the last concert on March 23, 2019, in Szarvas.

Reception 

In the week of October 18, 2018 Fekete részem peaked at no. 2 in the Hungarian Albums Chart and lasted in the ranking for three weeks. Their previous records Fata Morgana (released 2011), Égésföld released 2014 and Kint a vizből re-entered the Hungarian Album Charts as well.

Dániel Hári of Kultúrpart.hu wrote the band was able to increase their popularity and received much media coverage due their performance at Eurovision Song Contest in Lisbon in 2018. He described Fekete részem as their most technical album to date with a large musical and lyrical span. Felix Bayer of Spiegel Online described Vislát nyár as a modern metal track with hardcore influences and an great chorus where it is not necessary to know the Hungarian language to sing along. Alex Robert Ross of Vice drew a comparison with American post hardcore band Atreyu.

Chart performance

Notes

References 

2018 albums
AWS (band) albums
Hungarian-language albums